Härryda Municipality (Härryda kommun) is a municipality in Västra Götaland County in western Sweden. Its seat is located in the town of Mölnlycke, with about 19,000 inhabitants.

Göteborg Landvetter Airport, Sweden's second-largest airport is situated near the locality of Härryda, after which the municipality is named. The airport is named after Landvetter, the second biggest town in the municipality. City Airline has its head office in the Air Cargo Building on the grounds of the airport. Transwede Airways existed, its head office was on the airport property.

Härryda Municipality borders clockwise to the municipalities of Lerum, Bollebygd, Mark, Mölndal, Gothenburg and Partille.

The present municipality was created in 1971 through the amalgamation of the former municipalities of Björketorp, Landvetter and Råda.

Until November 19, 2007 the municipality was the only one in Sweden lacking a coat of arms, just using a logotype.

Localities
Hindås
Härryda
Hällingsjö
Landvetter
Mölnlycke (seat)
Rävlanda

References

External links

Härryda Municipality - Official site

Municipalities of Västra Götaland County
Metropolitan Gothenburg
Gothenburg and Bohus